The Adil Cabinet was the first cabinet established by the State of Pasundan following the formation of the state on 28 April 1948. It was composed of eight ministers and one official. Its term of office ran from 8 May 1948 to 10 January 1949.

Background
After the formation of the State of Pasundan, an election to choose the head of state of Pasundan was held on 28 February 1948. The election was won by R. A. A. Wiranatakusumah, and he was installed on 24 April 1948. Wiranatakusumah appointed Adil Puradiredja, a former resident of Priangan Regency, as the prime minister. Adil, along with his ministers, was officially installed on 8 May 1948. The cabinet was responsible to Prime Minister Adil Puradiredja.

Composition

Ministers

Portraits

Changes
On 14 October 1948, Justice Minister Soeparman died in a car crash during his working trip to Cirebon. He was replaced by Tan Hwat Tiang four days later. Tan concurrently held the position as the Minister of Transportation and Traffic Affairs.

The end of the cabinet
At the midnight of 19 December 1948, the Dutch launched military attack against the Republic of Indonesia. The Adil Cabinet resigned on the same day in protest. Similar event occurred in East Indonesia, on which the Ide Anak Agung Gde Agung cabinet also resigned on the same reason.

The resignation was in pursuance to the promise made by Adil to Mohammad Hatta, the vice president of Indonesia, on 12 December, that he and his cabinet would resign if and only if the Dutch attacked Indonesia.

The outgoing cabinet was officially replaced by the First Djumhana Cabinet on 10 January 1949.

Bibliography

References

Cabinets of Pasundan
Cabinets established in 1948
Cabinets disestablished in 1949